This is a list of all the commercial nuclear reactors in the world, sorted by country, with operational status. The list only includes civilian nuclear power reactors used to generate electricity for a power grid. All commercial nuclear reactors use nuclear fission. As of March 2023, there are 422 operable power reactors in the world, with a combined electrical capacity of 377.9 GW. Additionally, there are 58 reactors under construction and 104 reactors planned, with a combined capacity of 65 GW and 107 GW, respectively, while 325 more reactors are proposed. For non-power reactors, see List of nuclear research reactors. For fuel plants see List of Nuclear Reprocessing Plants. Where not otherwise specified, all information is sourced from the Power Reactor Information System (PRIS) of the International Atomic Energy Agency (IAEA).

In the following tables, the net capacity or reference unit power, expressed in megawatt (MW), is the maximum electricity output under reference ambient conditions, after deducting the losses within the system including the energy transformers.

Argentina

Armenia

Austria

Bangladesh

Belarus

Belgium

Brazil

Bulgaria

Canada

China

Cuba

Czech Republic

Egypt

Finland

France

Germany

Hungary

India

Iran

Italy

Japan

Kazakhstan

Lithuania

Mexico

Netherlands

North Korea

Pakistan

Philippines

Poland

Romania

Russia

Slovakia

Slovenia

South Africa

South Korea

Spain

Sweden

Switzerland

Taiwan

Turkey

Ukraine

United Arab Emirates

United Kingdom

United States

Uzbekistan

See also
Economics of nuclear power plants
Integrated Nuclear Fuel Cycle Information System
List of nuclear power stations
List of boiling water reactors
List of largest power stations
List of small modular reactor designs
List of nuclear reprocessing sites
Lists of nuclear disasters and radioactive incidents
Nuclear power by country

Notes and references

External links
IAEA list as of 2006
NED Database of Commercial Nuclear Power Reactors
Reactors Database by the World Nuclear Association

Lists of buildings and structures
Reactors